Mount Zion is a historic Baptist church located at Charlottesville, Virginia.  Although the current Mount Zion Baptist Church has only been in existence since 1884, the roots of the church are much deeper. The church began with a petition in 1864 to separate from the segregated white Baptist church, and the congregation was officially organized in 1867. Initially taking residence in the house of Samuel White, the congregation soon grew too large for the house, and in 1875 built a wooden church in the lot next door. In 1884, they finished the current, brick church that still stands today. The church was designed by George Wallace Spooner, who also helped rebuild the Rotunda at the University of Virginia.

Rich in cultural history, the Mount Zion Baptist Church has seen more than just prayer. A social and political hub for African-Americans, it has seen the turbulent times of Jim Crow, the Civil Rights Movement, and Urban Renewal. The congregation is still in place today, and the church remains a pillar of strength and pride in the black community.

In 1966 the Minister of the Mount Zion Baptist Church was J.B. Hamilton and the Clerk was Mrs. Ethel P. Nicholas.

It was listed on the National Register of Historic Places in 1992.

References

External links
Information on the Mount Zion Baptist Church from Virginia African Heritage Program

African-American history of Virginia
Neoclassical architecture in Virginia
Italianate architecture in Virginia
Churches on the National Register of Historic Places in Virginia
Churches completed in 1884
19th-century Baptist churches in the United States
Churches in Charlottesville, Virginia
Baptist churches in Virginia
National Register of Historic Places in Charlottesville, Virginia
Italianate church buildings in the United States
Neoclassical church buildings in the United States